Andrew Semple (June 10, 1837 – January 22, 1916) was a Canadian grain merchant, miller, and politician.

Born in Glasgow, Scotland, he emigrated to Canada with his family in 1841 settling in Canada West. Semple was educated at the Common Schools in the County of Simcoe. A farmer and miller, he held the offices of Councillor and Reeve of East Garafraxa for two years. He was first elected to the House of Commons of Canada for the electoral district of Wellington Centre in the 1887 federal election. A Liberal, he was re-elected in 1891 and 1896. He was defeated in 1900.

References
 
 

1837 births
1916 deaths
Liberal Party of Canada MPs
Members of the House of Commons of Canada from Ontario
Scottish emigrants to pre-Confederation Ontario
Immigrants to the Province of Canada